Brüel is a town in the Ludwigslust-Parchim district, in Mecklenburg-Western Pomerania, Germany. It is situated 24 km northeast of Schwerin.

Notable people

  (1811–1882), bookseller and publisher, founder of 
 Friedrich Schlie (1839–1902), archaeologist and art historian
 Johannes Schulze (1786–1869), educator and administrator

References

External links

 Website of Brüel
 Amt Sternberger Seenlandschaft

Cities and towns in Mecklenburg
Ludwigslust-Parchim
Populated places established in the 1340s
1340s establishments in the Holy Roman Empire
1340 establishments in Europe
Grand Duchy of Mecklenburg-Schwerin